Deafheaven is an American post-metal band formed in 2010. Originally based in San Francisco, the group began as a two-piece with singer George Clarke and guitarist Kerry McCoy, who recorded and self-released a demo album together. Following its release, Deafheaven recruited three new members and began to tour. Before the end of 2010, the band signed to Deathwish Inc. and later released their debut album Roads to Judah, in April 2011. They popularized a unique style blending black metal, shoegazing, and post-rock, among other influences, later called "blackgaze" by reviewers.

Deafheaven's second album, Sunbather, was released in 2013 to wide critical acclaim, becoming one of the best reviewed albums of the year in the US. In 2015 the band followed up with New Bermuda and in 2018 with Ordinary Corrupt Human Love. Their 2021 fifth album, Infinite Granite, drastically reduced the presence of screamed vocals.

History

Formation and demo (2010) 
Deafheaven formed in February 2010 in San Francisco, California with vocalist George Clarke and guitarist Kerry McCoy, who previously performed in the grindcore band Rise of Caligula together. Clarke is not sure how he arrived on the name Deafheaven, though he is aware of its appearance in William Shakespeare's Sonnet 29. The two words 'deaf' and 'heaven' were combined as a homage to Slowdive.

Clarke and McCoy recorded an untitled demo album in April 2010 at Atomic Garden Studios with Jack Shirley for about US$500, which the band could not afford at the time. Because the duo did not own an electric guitar or amp at the time, the demo was written on an acoustic guitar and recorded with equipment borrowed from the studio. The untitled demo, which was released digitally and on cassette tape in limited quantities, featured four songs that combined traditional black metal and post-rock. Originally, Deafheaven did not intend to release the material, but they later sent it out to a few of their favorite blogs. After the demo had been positively received, Clarke and McCoy recruited three additional musicians—bassist Derek Prine, guitarist Nick Bassett of the shoegaze band Whirr (formerly Whirl) and drummer Trevor Deschryver, who responded to an ad on Craigslist—to form a five-piece group, and started playing their first shows in July 2010.

Signing to Deathwish and Roads to Judah (2010–2012) 
Deafheaven announced they had signed to Deathwish Inc. in December 2010—a label that was founded by Converge's vocalist Jacob Bannon. Deathwish contacted Deafheaven, and originally only wanted to give their demo a wide physical release. By this point, the group already had some new material written and asked if Deathwish could release both the demo and the new material. The first release that Deafheaven released through Deathwish was a 7" vinyl single that featured "Libertine Dissolves" and "Daedalus", two songs that were taken from the group's demo. The single was pressed in a limited quantity and sent out as a gift to random people that made a purchase from Deathwish's webstore.

Their debut album, Roads to Judah, was released on April 26, 2011 through Deathwish. The title of the album is a reference to the N Judah light rail that provides transportation in Deafheaven's hometown, and lyrically the album is about Clarke's "year of substance abuse and debauchery." Roads to Judah received positive reviews from Decibel and RVA Magazine, and was placed on several year-end lists including NPR, Pitchfork and The A.V. Club. MSN Music also named Deafheaven one of the best new artists of 2011.

To promote Roads to Judah, Deafheaven performed at Austin, Texas' SXSW festival in March 2011, toured the United States with the Canadian noise rock band KEN mode in June 2011, performed at California's Sound and Fury Festival in July 2011, toured the US with the post-rock band Russian Circles in November 2011, and performed a European tour in February 2012. McCoy said that Russian Circles "took us under their wing" while on tour and taught them how a band ought to behave. He said, "The three rules of any successful band are to write good tunes, be excellent live, and to not be an asshole while doing that. We were always striving to do that, but [Russian Circles] hammered it into our heads." Deafheaven also participated in the mid-2012 festivals Northside in Brooklyn, New York and Fun Fun Fun in Austin, Texas.

As a part of Deathwish Inc's free live album series, Deafheaven released Live at The Blacktop in July 2011. The album featured an entire live performance from January 15, 2011 in Bell Gardens, California at The Blacktop—a former loading dock converted into a venue. In October 2012, Deafheaven released a split EP with the American black metal band Bosse-de-Nage through The Flenser. Deafheaven contributed a cover of two Mogwai songs, "Punk Rock" and "Cody", released as a single track. The two songs originate from Mogwai's 1999 album Come On Die Young. Also in 2012, Deafheaven released a remastered, limited-edition vinyl record of its 2010 demo through Sargent House.

Sunbather, new lineup and critical acclaim (2013–2014) 
As early as September 2011, Deafheaven announced they had begun writing new music for a potential split album, EP or full-length. At the time, McCoy described the material as being "faster, darker, a lot heavier and far more experimental" than Roads to Judah. However, in December 2012, Clarke described their new material as less melancholic and less centered around black metal, but rather featuring a more "lush and rock-driven, even pop-driven" sound at times. The new album, titled Sunbather, was written solely by founding members Clarke and McCoy—similar to the way its demo was composed, but different from Roads to Judah, which was written as a five-piece band. The duo were also joined in the studio by new drummer Daniel Tracy, who "added his own drum style to already-constructed song skeletons." The title of the album reflects Clarke's idea of perfection. He stated that it is meant to represent, "A wealthy, beautiful, perfect existence that is naturally unattainable and the struggles of having to deal with that reality because of your own faults, relationship troubles, family troubles, death, et cetera." Deafheaven entered the studio to record Sunbather in January 2013 with Jack Shirley, and released the album on June 11, 2013 through Deathwish.

Sunbather was critically acclaimed upon release. Metacritic rated the album 92/100, based on 18 reviews, and later declared it the best-reviewed major album of 2013. It was also Deafheaven's first release to chart on Billboard—it ranked at number 130 on the Billboard 200 and number 2 on the Top Heatseekers chart.

In addition to new drummer Daniel Tracy, who was a part of the band for the recording of Sunbather, the band recruited bassist Stephen Clark and guitarist Shiv Mehra for 2013 tours. Founding members Clarke and McCoy said previous band members parted ways due to difficulties with life on the road and earning little-to-no money. Deafheaven's first tour in support of Sunbather was a European/Russian tour with The Secret in April/May 2013 followed by a US tour with Marriages in June/July. In 2014, Deafheaven toured Australia in January, supported Between the Buried and Me with Intronaut and The Kindred in February/March, toured Asia and Europe in May/June, the US with Pallbearer in June, then embarked on a second European tour in August, and a North American tour with No Joy in September.

In 2013, Deafheaven members Daniel Tracy and Shiv Mehra formed a psychedelic rock side project called Creepers with Varun Mehra and Christopher Natividad. That year, the band released a self-titled EP, and in 2014, released its debut album Lush through All Black Recording Company—an indie label founded by George Clarke and former Deafheaven member Derek Prine.

On August 25, 2014, Deafheaven released a new single titled "From the Kettle Onto the Coil" as a part of the cable network Adult Swim's 2014 weekly singles series. Clarke described the song as following a similar formula to songs composed for Sunbather and was not a strong indication of what the band's third studio album might sound like.

New Bermuda, Ordinary Corrupt Human Love and 10 Years Gone (2015–2020) 

In July 2015, Deafheaven began teasing their third studio album for a possible October 2015 release through Epitaph Records' sister label Anti- with a short video featuring new music clips, studio footage and views of a rocky coastline. On July 28, 2015, the band announced their third studio album, titled New Bermuda, which was released on October 2, 2015, through Anti-. New Bermuda was named the 12th best album of the year in 2015 Spin magazine.

The band started working on the follow up to New Bermuda in January 2018, when they announced they were in the studio working on a new album, scheduled for release later in the year. On April 17, 2018, the band released "Honeycomb", the lead single to their fourth studio album Ordinary Corrupt Human Love. On June 12, 2018, a new track from the new album titled "Canary Yellow" was released. The album was released on July 13, 2018 through Anti-. It received widespread acclaim from critics. 

On December 7 it was announced that the single "Honeycomb" was nominated for a Grammy Award for Best Metal Performance.

The band released a B-side from their fourth album, "Black Brick", on February 27, 2019. The band released a 10-year commemorative live-in-studio record, called 10 Years Gone, on December 4, 2020. The release notes of the record stated that the band was "thankful [they] were able to do this project and that fans have stuck with [them] as [they] make new music for 2021," hinting at an upcoming studio album.

Infinite Granite (2021–present) 

On June 7, 2021 the band wiped their social media pages, and posted a teaser video with the date "08.20.21" on their official website as well as to their social media outlets. Two days later, a new single entitled "Great Mass of Color" was released to streaming services.  It features a shoegaze style with clean vocals, a departure from the black metal influences of their previous albums. It was then revealed to be the lead single to the band's fifth studio album, entitled Infinite Granite.

Musical style
Deafheaven's musical style has been described as black metal, blackgaze, post-metal, screamo, shoegaze, post-black metal, and art metal. Deafheaven's musical style has been described by Rolling Stone as a "boundary-pushing blend of black metal, shoegaze and post-rock". McCoy has cited various other influences on the band's sound, including alternative rock and early thrash metal, and said they do not consider themselves a black metal band, because, although influenced by the genre, they do not have "the ethos, the aesthetic or really the sound of one". In a 2017 interview with Red Bull Music Academy Daily, McCoy stated: "The whole shoegaze/black metal, or post-black metal thing, was being done ten years before we were a band."

Members 
 
Current members
 George Clarke – lead vocals (2010–present)
 Kerry McCoy – guitar (2010–present), bass (2010, 2012–2013)
 Daniel Tracy – drums (2012–present)
 Shiv Mehra – guitar, backing vocals, keyboards (2013–present)
 Chris Johnson – bass, backing vocals (2017–present)

Former members
 Nick Bassett – guitar (2010–2012)
 Derek Prine – bass (2010–2012)
 Trevor Deschryver – drums (2010–2011)
 Korey Severson – drums (2011–2012)<ref>"Deafheaven on their Surprisingly Short Road to Success" Red Bull Music Academy Daily</ref>
 Stephen Clark – bass (2013–2017)

Former session musicians
 John Kline – drums (2010)

Former touring musicians
 Gary Bettencourt – guitar (2011)
 Joey Bautista – guitar (2011–2012)
 Mike Coyle – guitar (2012)

Timeline

Discography

Studio albums
 Roads to Judah (2011)
 Sunbather (2013)
 New Bermuda (2015)
 Ordinary Corrupt Human Love (2018)
 Infinite Granite'' (2021)

References

External links

 
 Deafheaven on Deathwish Inc.

Musical groups established in 2010
2010 establishments in California
Deathwish Inc. artists
Musical groups from San Francisco
Black metal musical groups from California
American post-metal musical groups
American post-hardcore musical groups
Punk rock groups from California
Blackgaze musical groups
Anti- (record label) artists
Sargent House artists